Gahunje is a village and gram panchayat in Pune district of Maharashtra, India. It is situated in Mawal taluka of Pune district in the state of Maharashtra.

It lies on the northwestern border of Pimpri-Chinchwad, midway between Pune and Lonavala.

Maharashtra Cricket Association Stadium is situated in this village. This village is known for this Test cricket venue.

Geography 
Gahunje is located near Mumbai- Pune Express highway. This village's grampanchayat is have ISO certified. This village's 352.37  hector land is under cultivation. Milk dairy and agriculture are the primary occupations of this village's peoples. Rice, Wheat and Sugarcane are the primary crops in this village.  It have facilities such as solar lights on small settlements, roads,  drainage system and Grampanchayat's water service.

Education facilities 
Gahunje have 2 primary school of Jilha parishad.

Administration
The village is administrated by a sarpanch, an elected representative who leads a gram panchayat. At the time of the 2011 Census of India, the village was a self-contained gram panchayat, meaning that there were no other constituent villages governed by the body.

Demographics
At the 2011 census, the village comprised 863 households. The population of 4,046 was split between 2,461 males and 1,585 females.

Air travel connectivity 
The closest airport to the village is Pune Airport.

Recognition 
Gahunje village has achieved the awards of Tanta mukta scheme and Nirmal gram scheme (Clean village scheme).

See also
List of villages in Mawal taluka

References

Villages in Mawal taluka
Gram Panchayats in Pune district